B.R. Cohn Winery is a winery in Sonoma Valley, California in the United States.

History 

Bruce Cohn, former manager of the California rock band, The Doobie Brothers, purchased the original area in 1974.   He named the property the Olive Hill Estate Vineyards after the grove of 145-year-old olive Picholine Olive trees, from which he continues to make ultra-premium olive oil.

After selling grapes to other wineries for several years, Cohn founded his own winery, B.R. Cohn, in 1984. His first winemaker was the now-famous Helen Turley.  Like other wineries in the area it maintains a wine club and public tasting room, and hosts weddings and other events.

In 2015, the winery was bought by Vintage Wine Estates.

Wines 
The vineyards surrounding the winery are planted mostly in cabernet sauvignon grapes, with some pinot noir, zinfandel, petite sirah, cabernet franc, petit verdot, and malbec.  Syrah (sold only from the tasting room) and Chardonnay is grown in the carneros region.

The winery's flagship 1985 and 1986 Olive Hill Cabernets were ranked among the top ten in America and top 50 in the World by Wine Spectator, which gave each a rating of 94 out of 100.  The 2003 vintage was rated 93.  The North Coast Petit Syrah was one of two red "sweepstakes winners" at the prestigious 2007 San Francisco Chronicle Wine Competition.  The winery also produces merlot, rosé, and port.

Oil and vinegar 

Starting in the 1990s, B.R. Cohn was among the first companies involved in the re-emergence of artisan olive oil production in California.  Today it produces flavored and unflavored oils, including an organic variety, balsamic vinegars and other unique gourmet foods.

The company also produces vinegar on-site from cabernet, chardonnay, and sparkling wine (including pear chardonnay and a raspberry champagne flavors), using the French "Orleans" method whereby batches of vinegar are produced by adding a "mother" dose of old vinegar to fresh wine, then aging 18–22 months in oak barrels.  It also bottles a 25, 15 and a 12-year-old balsamic vinegar imported from Modena, Italy.

Cohn's oil and vinegar is widely available in premium grocery stores nationally, although some limited-production varieties are sold only directly.

See also
List of celebrities who own wineries and vineyards

References

External links 

 

Wineries in Sonoma County
Sonoma Valley